The 2023 season will be the Detroit Lions' upcoming 94th season in the National Football League and their third under the head coach/general manager tandem of Dan Campbell and Brad Holmes. They will look to improve upon their 9–8 record from last year and make the playoffs after a six year absence.

Player movements

Free agents
NFL teams will be able to sign free agents starting March 15, at 12 p.m. EST.

Additions

Subtractions

Draft

Notes

Current roster

Staff

Preseason
The Lions' preseason opponents and schedule will be announced in the spring.

Regular season

2023 opponents
Listed below are the Lions' opponents for 2023. Exact dates and times will be announced in the spring.

References

External links
 

Detroit
Detroit Lions seasons
Detroit Lions